EA Pacific (formerly known as Burst Studios and Westwood Pacific) was a developer formally owned by Virgin Interactive's North American operations, and was based in Irvine, California. Burst Studios was beset by production problems during its early years; Virgin Interactive's president of worldwide publishing, Brett W. Sperry, commented in 1997, "The way the Burst studio was structured made a lot of sense on paper, but for a variety of reasons, it wasn't delivering product at the end of the day." Burst Studios was acquired by Electronic Arts together with Westwood Studios and Virgin's North American publishing operations in August 1998. The company was later renamed to Westwood Pacific, under that name, the company developed or co-developed games like Nox and Command & Conquer: Red Alert 2.

It was later renamed to EA Pacific. Some actual Westwood Studios employees were still working with the studio. One of the senior modelers, who worked on Command & Conquer (1995), was part of the Command & Conquer: Generals (2003) team.

EA Pacific was absorbed into EA Los Angeles in 2003. Some employees then went to Petroglyph Games.

Games

Cancelled 

Freak Boy

References

External links 
 

Video game development companies
Electronic Arts
Defunct video game companies of the United States
Video game companies established in 1995
Video game companies disestablished in 2003
Defunct companies based in Greater Los Angeles